Hulak is the surname of the following people:
Derek Hulak (born 1989),  Canadian ice hockey defenceman
Krunoslav Hulak (1951–2015), Croatian chess master
Mykola Hulak (1821–1899), Ukrainian political and cultural activist, journalist, scientist, interpreter and lawyer
Semen Hulak-Artemovsky (1813–1873), Ukrainian opera composer, singer, actor and dramatist